Laura Cinti is an artist working with biology.

She is the co-founder and co-director of C-LAB,  a developing art/science studio lab with Howard Boland who is the co-founder and artistic director of C-LAB and an artist working with Synthetic Biology.

Laura Cinti has a PhD from UCL Slade School of Fine Art in interdisciplinary capacity with UCL University College London Centre of Biomedical Imaging, an MA in Interactive Media: Critical Theory & Practice (Distinction) from Goldsmiths, University of London and BA (Hons) Fine Art (First Class) from University of Hertfordshire.

Projects
 Martian Rose is an installation which carries the romantic and destructive idea of giving a rose to Mars. Using a planetary simulation chamber the exhibited rose has been exposed to Martian Environment for 6 hours. Mars is a cold place with plummeting temperatures from −60 °C down to −130 °C, the atmospheric pressure is less than 1% of earth's, much lower than on Mount Everest, the prevalent gas is carbon dioxide and UV light penetrates an unshielded atmosphere. The experiment took place on 27 March 2007 at the Mars Simulation Laboratory (University of Aarhus, Denmark) where two (miniature) red roses were subjected to proxy Martian parameters.
 The Cactus Project is  transgenic artwork involving the fusion of human genetic material into the cactus genome resulting in the cactus expressing human hair.

External links
 Official site of C-Lab
 Laura Cinti explaining "The Martian Rose" in Less Remote Symposium
 Exposing Roses to Martian Atmosphere, Art + Science Experiment 2007

Further reading
 Laura Cinti&Howard Boland, TheMartian Rose (2007): Exposing a rose to Martian environment  on Mutamorphosis, 22.02.2009
 Art Outsiders, catalogue, 2009
 Leonardo, Volume 42, Number 2, April 2009, The Martian Rose, Howard Boland&Laura Cinti
 The Martian Rose (2007): Exposing a rose to the Martian Environment, information on Multi, Volume 2 Number 1 (Winter 2008)  Page 52
 Transgenic, hair-growing plants on museumofhoaxes.com

Bibliography
 Brent Waters, This Mortal Flesh: Incarnation and Bioethics, Brazos Press, 2009, 205 pages, English, 
 Brent Waters, From Human to Posthuman: Christian Theology And Technology in a Postmodern World , Ashgate Pub Co, 2006, 166 pages,English, 
 Elaine A. King and Gail Levin, Ethics And the Visual Arts, Allworth Press, 2006, 288 pages, English,

References

Living people
BioArt
Alumni of the Slade School of Fine Art
Synthetic biology artists
Year of birth missing (living people)